The Short Titles Act 1962 (No. 5) is an Act of the Oireachtas. It authorises the citation, by short titles, of English statutes applied to Ireland by Poynings' Act 1495 and by the Maintenance and Embracery Act 1634, and of pre-Union Irish statutes.

This Act is one of the Short Titles Acts 1896 to 2007.

Each of the three Schedules to this Act was amended by section 6 of the Statute Law Revision Act 2007.

References

External links
The Short Titles Act 1962, as originally enacted, from the Irish Statute Book.
List of amendments and repeals from the Irish Statute Book.

1962 in Irish law
Acts of the Oireachtas of the 1960s